The Hyperiidae are a family of amphipods, containing these genera:
Euthemisto Bovallius, 1887
Hyperia Latreille in Desmarest, 1823
Hyperiella Bovallius, 1887
Hyperoche Bovallius, 1887
Laxohyperia M. Vinogradov & Volkov, 1982
Parathemisto Boeck, 1870
Pegohyperia Barnard, 1931
Themisto Guérin-Méneville, 1825

References

Hyperiidea
Crustacean families